This is a list of Estonian television related events from 2018.

Events
 Eesti Laul 2018

Debuts

Television shows

Ending this year

Births

Deaths

See also
2018 in Estonia

References

2010s in Estonian television